Dipole field strength in free space, in telecommunications, is the electric field strength caused by a half wave dipole under ideal conditions. The actual field strength in terrestrial environments is calculated by empirical formulas based on this field strength.

Power density 

Let N be the effective power radiated from an isotropic antenna and p be the power density at a distance d from this source

 

Power density is also defined in terms of electrical field strength;

Let E be the electrical field and Z be the impedance of the free space

 

The following relation is obtained by equating the two,

 

or by rearranging the terms

Numerical values 
Impedance of free space is roughly 

Since a half wave dipole is used, its gain over an isotropic antenna should also be taken into consideration,

 

In this equation SI units are used.

Expressing the same equation in:
 kW instead of W in power, 
km instead of m in distance and 
mV/m instead of V/m in electric field 

In this case,

See also 

Antennas
Effective radiated power
Electric field
Field strength meter
Radio propagation model

References 

Telecommunication theory
Antennas
Broadcast engineering
Radio frequency propagation model